The Cathedral of Saint Joseph is the mother church for the Roman Catholic Diocese of Jefferson City in Missouri. The cathedral serves as the parish church for the bishop, who is currently the Most Reverend Shawn McKnight, the fourth bishop of Jefferson City. The cathedral sits on a  site that also includes a Carmelite monastery, the Alphonse J. Schwartze Memorial Catholic Center, St. Joseph Cathedral School, and the Cathedral of Saint Joseph parish offices, which were formerly a convent that housed the Sisters of Mercy. The current pastor is the Reverend Fr. Louis Nelen.

History 

The Diocese of Jefferson City was a new diocese in the state of Missouri that was created in 1956 from territory taken from the Archdiocese of St. Louis, the Diocese of Kansas City, and the Diocese of Saint Joseph. From the time of the creation of the diocese, St. Peter's Church in downtown Jefferson City served as the Mother Church for the diocese until the new cathedral could be designed and completed. The site, across from Jefferson City's Memorial Park, was chosen by Monsignor Joseph A. Vogelweid, who was the first Vicar General of the diocese. The Cathedral of Saint Joseph was the embodiment of the vision of the first Bishop of Jefferson City, the Most Reverend Joseph M. Marling, and Monsignor Gerard L. Poelker, pastor at the time of groundbreaking. The design of the cathedral was completed following the Second Vatican Council. In 1966, that design included plans to build a modern, circular Cathedral. Architects for the project were Maguolo and Quick from St. Louis, Missouri. The design of the stained glass and marble in the cathedral was performed by Robert Brunelli of Kansas City, Missouri. The contractor for the cathedral was Prost Builders of Jefferson City. Groundbreaking occurred on August 20, 1967. The first Mass took place at midnight on December 25, 1968. On December 27, 1968, Bishop Marling contacted Pope Paul VI to declare that the new church was to be the new Cathedral for the Diocese. At that point, it replaced St. Peter's Cathedral, which returned to parish church status. Despite being completed in 1968, formal dedication of the Cathedral did not take place until May 5, 1974, due to a change in Bishops. Cardinal John Joseph Carberry presided over the consecration and was assisted by both Bishop Marling and the second bishop, the Most Reverend Michael F. McAuliffe.

The first diocesan priest was ordained in 1969. The first bishop ordained and installed in the cathedral was Bishop McAuliffe, also in 1969.

Architecture 

The cathedral church is built of reinforced concrete and steel, with an exterior facade of Indiana limestone. The interior of the church, which seats 950 people, has  of terrazzo flooring. The beams meet at a steel ring, in the center, that is about nine feet in diameter. The outer roof is made of copper, with sixteen gables in a design which signifies a crown.

Within the cathedral, there are twelve pillars covered in walnut symbolizing the twelve Apostles. Consecration candles for each pillar were added in 2009 by Bishop John R. Gaydos. Sound and surface noise inherent in terrazzo flooring required unusual attention to achieve good acoustics in the large open, room. Padded walls, covered in mesh, with strips of walnut help to absorb the noise. Other acoustical features include the padded red oak pews, as well as the decorative faceted glass windows. Another feature of the design of the cathedral is that there are no supporting pillars in the open expanse.

Sanctuary 
The sanctuary wall is polished buff travertine. The steps and raised surfaces in the sanctuary are of contrasting walnut travertine. The altar is a single block of polished marble weighing 7000 pounds. Within the altar are relics from St. Clement, St. Irenaeus, and St. Aurelius. The sanctuary itself is oval-shaped and was designed specifically for ceremonies in which the bishop presides and for post-Vatican II liturgy. The cathedra or bishop's throne sits immediately beneath the bishop's coat of arms, which hangs on the sanctuary wall. The crucifix with a corpus of walnut travertine is suspended from the wall.

During the Christmas season, the cathedral is noted for its Nativity set, which was first displayed in 2009.

The Blessed Sacrament Chapel 
The Blessed Sacrament Chapel is immediately to the left of the sanctuary. A glass partition separates it from the rest of the main seating area. Capacity is 50 people. Within the altar of the chapel are relics from St. Clement, St. Irenaeus, and St. Liberatus. Five faceted glass windows in the chapel, created by Jacoby Studios in St. Louis, symbolize the functions of the priest. These windows are visible from the main seating area in the cathedral. The first window pictures the carpenter's hammer and square associated with St. Joseph, patron of priests. The second window shows the Greek symbols Chi-Rho, with rings and leaves indicating a priest's role in performing Christian marriages. The third window with a scroll and lamp illustrate a priest's service as teacher. The fourth window pictures a shepherd's crook and book, alluding to the pastoral duties and to promulgating the Gospels. The fifth window, which is in the sanctuary of the chapel, shows crossed branches, a crown, and a star as reminders of eternal reward in victory over death, and the priest's function in performing Christian burial. Also, within the chapel is a cross, known as the Jubilee Cross, which contains a relic of the True Cross. The cross was created by Lage's Cabinet Shop of Jefferson City for the Jubilee Year of 2000.

Adoration Chapel 
Perpetual adoration began at the cathedral in 1986. The chapel is immediately adjacent to main seating area of the cathedral but is accessible without entering the main seating area of the cathedral.

Sacristy 

As was ancient custom, the sacristy is at the entrance of the cathedral, permitting processions to and from the altar. The Bishop's private sacristy was installed in 2005 immediately adjacent to the main sacristy. There is a minor sacristy attached to the Blessed Sacrament Chapel.

Baptistry 
The baptistry is also located at the entrance. The baptistry was remodeled in 2006. Two skylights in the ceiling bathe the font in natural light. The font is the original Italian marble baptistry made for the cathedral. The floor is made of similar marble to that which is in the sanctuary. An ambry, built in 2004, resides in the baptistry and is made of wood and glass. It contains the oil of the sick, Sacred Chrism, and the oil of the Catechumens, blessed at the Chrism Mass, which is celebrated each Lent in the cathedral. A statue of the Risen Christ is also present.

Undercroft 
The Cathedral features an undercroft, which serves as a large multi-purpose room for various parish and diocesan functions. The undercroft is accessed via doors which open to the south.

Features

Doors 

The main doors of the cathedral are 500 pounds each and are a replacement of the original doors. Due to the building standing on a slope, the doors open at ground level. Decorative embellishments to the light-finished wooden doors are a reminder of Christ. The doors were designed by Brother Stephen Erspammer, S.M., of St. Louis. The right and left sets of doors have handles in the shape of a Greek Alpha and Omega, recalling John's beatific vision of Christ in Revelation. A bronze medallion embedded in the center set of doors depicts an eternal Christ, seated among the sun, moon, stars, and rainbows of the heavens. With one hand, the figure makes the ancient gesture of a teacher. The other hand holds the book of Scriptures, with the words "Ego sum lux mundi," which means "I am the light of the world." The Christ image is situated on one side of the medallion, so that it remains whole, even when the Cathedral doors are open. The style is in keeping with ancient Church art and the contemporary design of the cathedral. From a practical standpoint, one of the sets of doors has an electric device that helps people with disabilities to open the door, making the Cathedral accessible to the disabled. The doors were commissioned and blessed by Bishop Gaydos. The blessing took place in June 2001 on Pentecost Sunday.

Stained glass windows 
The twelve triangular stained glass windows in the nave of the cathedral employ their symbolism in color and light. As one moves from the sanctuary, on either side, the color in the windows grows proportionately lighter to surround a figure of the Risen Christ over the doors of the cathedral.

Artwork 
Marble figures of St. Joseph and of the Blessed Virgin Mary stand in wall niches in the cathedral. A figure of the Sacred Heart of Jesus stands at the Blessed Sacrament Chapel to the left of the nave. Each of these figures is five feet tall and is made of unpolished travertine. The sculptors' tool marks are still visible in the figures. There are fourteen polished marble Stations of the Cross hanging around the seating area. There are three mosaics—the Infant Jesus of Prague, Our Lady of Perpetual Help, and St. Anne. The statuary, mosaics, and stations were imported from Italy for the cathedral.

Stations of the Cross 
The fourteen Stations of the Cross which adorn the cathedral's walls are Italian marble, a gift from the former seminary of the diocese.

Organ 
A dramatic decorative point in the cathedral is the tier of pipes set into the wall at the organ. Contained in a tone chamber behind the tier are 1,758 individual pipes made of wood and metal. One hundred and sixty people employed 13 different crafts to build this three-keyboard Wicks instrument. Typically, the choir stands below the pipes during important Mass celebrations. In 2006, the Vatican organist, James Edward Goettsche, performed a concert for the golden anniversary for the Diocese.

Grounds 
The campus features a  solid marble statue of St. Joseph and the Christ Child. It faces east toward the Carmelite monastery and the chancery and is located on the east lawn. It was added to the campus in 2005 from a closed parish in St. Louis. Also on the east lawn, there is a pin oak, known as the Pentecost Tree, which was planted by Bishop Gaydos in 1999. Soil used to plant the tree was brought to the campus from each of the parishes of the diocese. At the Bishop's entrance to the cathedral, is a modern, concrete sculpture of St. Francis and the animals. It is a two-sided sculpture that is the work Siegfried Reinhardt of St. Louis. It was donated to the cathedral in 2009 by a parishioner. There is a cornerstone also near the Bishop's entrance. A limestone engraved sign adorns the front lawn. It was installed in 1985. There is a grotto of Our Lady of Fatima, which includes the figures of the Blessed Mother, the three seers, and animals. It is located on the south lawn and was donated by the closed LaSalette Seminary. Each of the figures is made of concrete and was restored in 2009.

School 
St. Joseph Cathedral School (SJCS) sits on a 25-acre property across from Memorial Park, boasting the largest campus and most “green space” of any elementary school in Jefferson City. The newly created Diocese of Jefferson City established St. Joseph Cathedral School as an elementary school in September, 1960. This was within a year and a half of the founding of St. Joseph Parish on April 6, 1958. The school opened during the 1960–61 school year with 1st through 6th grades. 7th and 8th grades were added in the 1961–62 school year. The first class graduated in May, 1962. The kindergarten class, the enrichment program, and the early morning and after school programs were established with the 1986–1987 school year to meet the childcare needs of school parents. A preschool was established in August, 1995 for 4-year-olds and in August, 1996 for 3-year-olds.
The main school building, constructed during the 1959–60 school year, served both as the parish church and school. The church was located on the first floor with a school on the second floor. A cafeteria was located in the basement. The first floor was converted to classrooms when the Cathedral Church was opened in 1968. A convent was constructed west of the main school building in 1960, with classrooms located in the basement. The convent currently houses parish offices and meeting space. Six classrooms, a music room, science lab, computer lab and special service classrooms were added to the main school building in 1984 to meet the needs of an expanding enrollment of over 400 students.
The Sisters of Mercy of Swinford, Ireland, served as administrators and faculty members from 1960 until 1988. The school year 1987–88 had co-principals with an Irish sister and Barbara Odneal sharing the job. In 1988, the parish employed the first full-time lay principal, Paul Hanna. Lay teachers served in the school beginning in 1968, with only a few on staff with the Sisters. By 1988, the school was totally staffed by lay teachers, with the sisters feeling the school was well established and their mission had been completed. In 2002, the school population had grown sufficiently to add the position of assistant principal, hiring Mrs. Susan Ponder, who had previously taught 3rd grade at SJCS.
Beginning in the summer of 2008, following a parish Capital Campaign, a new construction project added a new library, cafeteria and kitchen, computer and science labs, administrative offices and sixteen new classrooms (including band and music rooms).
During the school year 2010–11, the school celebrated its 50th anniversary and enrollment topped 500 students. This was marked by a special Mass with Bishop John Gaydos and by other school events through the year. The 2011–12 school year marked the first time a sitting U.S. Senator visited our school, as Senator Roy Blunt visited his grandson's 2nd grade classroom. The current principal of St. Joseph Cathedral School is Mr. Spencer Allen.

Historic guests

Cardinals 
Various cardinals of the Church have visited the cathedral:
 John Joseph Carberry in 1969
 Juan Landázuri Ricketts, OFM in 1994
 William Wakefield Baum in 1997
 Avery Dulles, SJ in 2006
 John Patrick Foley in 2008
The following Cardinals visited the Cathedral prior to being elevated to the cardinalate:
 Justin Francis Rigali served as consecrator for the installation of Bishop Gaydos when he was Archbishop of St. Louis
 Agostino Cacciavillan when he was Apostolic Pro-Nuncio in 1997
 Bernard Francis Law when he was Bishop of Springfield-Cape Girardeau in 1984 for the Silver Anniversary of the Diocese
 Luigi Raimondi when he was the Apostolic Delegate to the United States in 1969
 Raymond Leo Burke as Archbishop of St. Louis

Governors 
Since Jefferson City is the capital city of Missouri, numerous recent governors of the state of Missouri have attended Mass at the cathedral.
 Warren E. Hearnes in 1969 for the installation of Bishop McAuliffe
 Christopher S. Bond in 1974
 Joseph P. Teasdale, the first Catholic governor of Missouri
 Matt Blunt in 2008
 Jay Nixon in 2009

See also
List of Catholic cathedrals in the United States
List of cathedrals in the United States

References

External links 

Official Cathedral Site
Diocese of Jefferson City Official Site

Churches in the Roman Catholic Diocese of Jefferson City
Churches in Cole County, Missouri
Buildings and structures in Jefferson City, Missouri
Joseph, Jefferson City
Roman Catholic churches completed in 1968
Tourist attractions in Jefferson City, Missouri
1968 establishments in Missouri
Buildings and structures in Cole County, Missouri
20th-century Roman Catholic church buildings in the United States